The Silvaș (also: Silvuț) is a left tributary of the river Strei in Romania. It flows into the Strei near Plopi.

References

Rivers of Romania
Rivers of Hunedoara County